Narasimhapuram is a village in Eluru district of the Indian state of Andhra Pradesh. It is administered under of Eluru revenue division.

Demographics 

 Census of India, Narasimhapuram has population of 701 of which 360 are males while 341 are females. Average Sex Ratio is 947. Population of children with age 0-6 is 89 which makes up 12.70% of total population of village, Child sex ratio is 874. Literacy rate of the village was 66.99%.

References

Villages in Eluru district